Jurovski Brod   is a village in Croatia, located on the border with Slovenia. It is connected by the D6 highway.

Populated places in Karlovac County